Netherlands participated at both editions of the European Games.

There were plans for the Netherlands to host the 2019 European Games but this was dropped due to a lack of support for funding the event.

Medal table

See also 
 Netherlands at the Olympics

References